Bernard Peters  was a nuclear physicist, with a specialty in cosmic radiation. He was a recipient of the Padma Bhushan, the third highest Indian civilian award.

Life
Towards the end of the First World War, his father, pharmacology researcher and physician, sent him to the Black Forest to a farmer so he could obtain food in exchange for manual labor.
In 1942, under the direction of Robert Oppenheimer, Peters completed his doctorate in physics. During his time at the Berkeley Radiation Laboratory Peters was active in the Federation of Architects, Engineers, Chemists and Technicians, a labor union affiliated to the Congress of Industrial Organizations.

In J Robert Oppenheimer's 1949 House Un-American Activities Committee hearing, Peters was accused of being a communist sympathizer, a "crazy person" and "quite a red" by Oppenheimer. The Rochester Times-Union broke the story a few days later, and Peters soon realized that his academic career in the US was affected. Peters could not find work in the United States. In 1951, he left the country to Mumbai, India, where he continued to study cosmic rays for eight years. Over the next four decades, he directed several studies on cosmic rays.

Peters died February 2, 1993, in Copenhagen, Denmark.

Works
Deuteron disintegration by electrons. Scattering of mesotrons of spin ¹/₂, University of California, Berkeley, 1942 (thèse doctorale)
Cosmic rays, solar particles, and space research, New York : Academic Press, 1963
Cosmic radiation and its origin : contemporary problems, Neuilly-sur-Seine, France : European Space Research Organisation, 1967
Creation of particles at cosmic-ray energies, Genève : CERN, 1966
Cosmic rays, New York : Academic Press, 1963

References

People associated with CERN
Recipients of the Padma Bhushan in science & engineering
1910 births
1993 deaths
Nuclear physicists
German emigrants to Denmark